Gao Yumeng (born April 13, 2001) is a Chinese pair skater. With her skating partner, Xie Zhong, she is the 2017 World Junior bronze medalist and 2017 Chinese national bronze medalist on the senior level.

Early career 
Gao began learning to skate in 2008. During the 2015–2016 season, she competed in partnership with Li Bowen. Competing on the senior level, they finished 5th at the 2016 Chinese Championships. They placed 7th at the 2016 Winter Youth Olympics, held in February in Hamar, Norway, and 13th at the 2016 World Junior Championships, held in March in Debrecen, Hungary. The pair was coached by Luan Bo, Song Lun, and Li Yinwei in Harbin, China.

Partnership with Xie 
Gao and Xie Zhong are coached by Zhao Hongbo in Beijing.

2016–2017 season  
Making their international debut as a pair, they placed 5th at a Junior Grand Prix (JGP) event in early September 2016 in Ostrava, Czech Republic. They had the same result at their second JGP assignment, in Saransk, Russia. In December, they won the bronze medal competing as seniors at the Chinese Championships.

In March 2017, Gao/Xie won the bronze medal at the World Junior Championships in Taipei, having ranked second in the short program and third in the free skate.

2017–2018 season 
Gao/Xie placed 4th at JGP Poland and 2nd at JGP Croatia, qualifying for the Junior Grand Prix Final (JGPF). They finished 4th at both JGPF and World Junior Championships. They split at the end of this season.

Programs

With Xie

With Li

Competitive highlights 
GP: Grand Prix; JGP: Junior Grand Prix

With Xie

With Li

References

External links 
 

2001 births
Chinese female pair skaters
Living people
Figure skaters from Tianjin
Figure skaters at the 2016 Winter Youth Olympics
World Junior Figure Skating Championships medalists